Poteet is a surname. Notable people with the surname include: 

Cody Poteet (born 1994), American baseball pitcher
George Poteet, American racing driver
Jerry Poteet (1936–2012), American martial arts instructor
Scott Poteet, American pilot